Varkan (also Romanized as Varkān and Warkān) is a village in Golab Rural District, Barzok District, Kashan County, Isfahan Province, Iran. At the 2006 census, its population was 545, in 194 families.

Back in the days, the Varkan region was considered an imperative strategic area because of its unique location and natural resources and it was the residence of significant figures in its prime times. Its archeological and historic significance is still evident now.

The people of Varkan speak "Raji" dialect whose structure and formation clearly demonstrate its roots in ancient Persian literature.

References 

Populated places in Kashan County